The Call of the North is a 1921 American silent drama film produced by Famous Players-Lasky and distributed by Paramount Pictures. It was directed by Joseph Henabery and stars Jack Holt. It is based on the 1903 novel The Conjuror's House: a Romance of the Free Forest by Stewart Edward White and its 1908 play adaptation The Call of the North by George Broadhurst starring Robert Edeson. This film is a remake of an earlier 1914 version directed by Cecil B. DeMille. It is not known whether the film currently survives.

Plot
As described in a film magazine, Ned Trent (Holt), a free trader who has successfully opposed the iron rule of the Hudson's Bay Company factor Galen Albret (Berry), is captured and brought to the trading post. They plan to keep Trent there until the first snowfall and then send him out upon the long trail without any food or rifle, a custom said to be followed by agents of the company. Defying the factor, Trent falls in love with the factor's daughter Virginia (Bellamy) and finds his affection reciprocated. When her attempt to aid Trent to escape brings her father to the verge of murder, it is discovered that Albret had been responsible for the death of Trent's father many years earlier. However, in the end the complex situation is worked out logically to a satisfactory end.

Cast
 Jack Holt as Ned Trent
 Madge Bellamy as Virginia Albret
 Noah Beery as Galen Albret
 Francis McDonald as Achille Picard
 Edward Martindel as Graham Stewart
 Helen Ferguson as Elodie Albret
 Jack Herbert as Louis Placide

References

External links

1921 films
American silent feature films
Films based on American novels
American films based on plays
Films directed by Joseph Henabery
Paramount Pictures films
Films based on adaptations
1921 drama films
Silent American drama films
American black-and-white films
1920s American films